Barystethus tropicus is a species of the true weevil family.

Description 
This species is usually black but it is quite variable in coloration. The body is elliptic, the legs and the rostrum are smooth and glossy, elytra are striated and rostrum is slightly arched.

Distribution 
This species occurs in Papua New Guinea.

References 

 Catalogue of life
  Encyclopedia of Life
 Curculionidae Wtaxa
 G. P. Setliff  Annotated checklist of weevils from the Papuan region (Coleoptera, Curculionoidea) 

Dryophthorinae
Arthropods of New Guinea
Beetles described in 1885
Taxa named by Francis Polkinghorne Pascoe